Alberto Ortiz Moreno (born 24 May 1985), known as Tito, is a Spanish footballer who plays as a defensive midfielder.

Club career
Born in Santa Coloma de Gramenet, Province of Barcelona, Catalonia, Tito's professional input in his country consisted of 120 Segunda División matches and five goals over four seasons in service of UE Llagostera, UCAM Murcia CF and CF Reus Deportiu. His first appearance in that tier took place on 23 August 2014 in a 2–0 away loss against UD Las Palmas as a Llagostera player, and he scored his first goal the following 2 May for the same club to close the 2–2 draw at Real Betis.

Abroad, Tito competed in the Polish Ekstraklasa with Legia Warsaw and the Norwegian Eliteserien with Sandefjord Fotball.

References

External links
Sandefjord official profile 

1985 births
Living people
People from Santa Coloma de Gramenet
Sportspeople from the Province of Barcelona
Spanish footballers
Footballers from Catalonia
Association football midfielders
Segunda División players
Segunda División B players
UDA Gramenet footballers
RCD Espanyol B footballers
Benidorm CF footballers
UE Costa Brava players
UCAM Murcia CF players
CF Reus Deportiu players
Ekstraklasa players
Legia Warsaw players
Eliteserien players
Sandefjord Fotball players
Spanish expatriate footballers
Expatriate footballers in Poland
Expatriate footballers in Norway
Spanish expatriate sportspeople in Poland
Spanish expatriate sportspeople in Norway